Brenna is a village in Porsanger Municipality in Troms og Finnmark county, Norway. The village is located on the western coast of the Sværholt Peninsula, on the eastern shore of the Porsangerfjorden. Brenna Chapel is located in this small village.

References

Villages in Finnmark
Porsanger
Populated places of Arctic Norway